Ödön Gróf (15 April 1915 – 16 January 1997) was a Hungarian swimmer who competed in the 1936 Summer Olympics. He was born in Neteča, Kingdom of Croatia-Slavonia, Austria-Hungary.

In the 1936 Olympics he won a bronze medal in the 4 × 200 m freestyle relay event. He was also seventh in his semifinal of the 400 m freestyle event and third in his first round heat of 100 m freestyle event and did not advance in both occasions.

External links
profile

1915 births
1997 deaths
People from Virovitica-Podravina County
People from the Kingdom of Croatia-Slavonia
Hungarian male swimmers
Olympic swimmers of Hungary
Swimmers at the 1936 Summer Olympics
Olympic bronze medalists for Hungary
World record setters in swimming
Olympic bronze medalists in swimming
Hungarian male freestyle swimmers
European Aquatics Championships medalists in swimming
Medalists at the 1936 Summer Olympics
Sport in Virovitica-Podravina County